The Mahakam or Barito-Mahakam languages are a couple of closely related Dayak (Austronesian) languages of Borneo:
 Ampanang
 Tunjung

References

 
Barito languages